Mohamad Tavakoli-Targhi (born 1957) is an Iranian-born Canadian scholar, editor, author, professor, and program director. He is a professor of History and Near and Middle Eastern Civilizations, and he serves as the Director of Elahé Omidyar Mir-Djalali Institute of Iranian Studies at the University of Toronto Mississauga. Tavakoli-Targhi's areas of research include Iranian Studies, Middle Eastern history, Gender Studies, modernity, nationalism, Orientalism, and occidentalism.

Biography 
Mohamad Tavakoli-Targhi was born in 1957 in Tehran, Iran. He attended the University of Iowa, and received a BA degree (1980) in political science and an MA degree (1981) in history; and has a PhD (1988) in history from the University of Chicago.

He previously taught history courses at the Illinois State University from 1989 to 2003. He moved to the University of Toronto in 2004, where he is the first director of the Elahé Omidyar Mir-Djalali Institute of Iranian Studies. Starting in 2022, a multi-year research partnership was formed between the Encyclopædia Iranica and the University of Toronto, under Tavakoli-Targhi's leadership.

Tavakoli-Targhi has served as an editor including at the academic journal, Comparative Studies of South Asia, Africa and the Middle East from 2001 until 2012; and at Iran Nameh from 2011 until 2015. He was previously served as the president of the International Society for Iranian Studies in 2009 to 2010.

Publications

Books

Articles and chapters

References

External links 
 Official website
 University of Toronto Mississauga profile

1957 births
Living people
People from Tehran
University of Iowa alumni
University of Chicago alumni
Academic staff of the University of Toronto Mississauga
Iranian emigrants to Canada
Iranian emigrants to the United States
Iranian Iranologists
Middle Eastern studies scholars
Iranian diaspora studies scholars